The Tiger Murder Case (German: Der Tiger) is a 1930 German mystery film directed by Johannes Meyer and starring Charlotte Susa, Harry Frank and Hertha von Walther. It was shot at the Babelsberg Studios in Berlin. The film's sets were designed by the art director Willi Herrmann.

Synopsis
A mysterious killer nicknamed The Tiger is on the loose, leading to frantic attempts to identify them.

Cast

References

Bibliography
 Bergfelder, Tim & Bock, Hans-Michael. The Concise Cinegraph: Encyclopedia of German. Berghahn Books, 2009.

External links

1930 films
1930s mystery drama films
Films of the Weimar Republic
German mystery drama films
1930s German-language films
Films directed by Johannes Meyer
UFA GmbH films
1930 crime drama films
German crime drama films
German black-and-white films
1930s German films
Films shot at Babelsberg Studios